The Minister for International Development Cooperation is the cabinet minister in the Swedish Government responsible for foreign aid and global development. The cabinet minister is, like the rest of the Swedish Government, nominated and appointed by the Prime Minister of Sweden who in turn is appointed by the Swedish Riksdag. The cabinet minister belongs to the Ministry for Foreign Affairs.

The position was established in 1954 and the first officeholder was Ulla Lindström. Lindström is also the person who has served in this capacity during the longest time, 12 years. The current cabinet minister to hold the office is Johan Forssell, appointed on 18 October 2022.

List of Ministers

|}

Government ministers of Sweden